Ankara Ekspresi (English title: Ankara Express) is a 1970 Turkish film directed by Muzaffer Arslan, adapted from the book of the same name by Esat Mahmut Karakurt. It stars Ediz Hun and Filiz Akın.

The film won five Golden Orange awards: best film, best director (Muzaffer Aslan), best actress (Filiz Akın), best screenplay (Bülent Oran) and best cinematography (Cengiz Tacer)

Cast 
Filiz Akın - Hilda
Ediz Hun - Binbaşı Seyfi Bey
Leyla Sayar - İrma
Kadir İnanır - Maximillian
Kayhan Yıldızoğlu - Albay Klinger
Bülent Oran
Hüseyin Kutman - Jackson
Altan Günbay - Binbaşı Kolman
Aliye Rona - Büyükanne
Bora Ayanoğlu
Süheyl Eğriboz
Erdo Vatan
Zeki Sezer
Ali Demir

References

External links 
 

1970s musical drama films
1970s adventure drama films
Films set in Istanbul
Films shot in Istanbul
Golden Orange Award for Best Film winners
Films based on Turkish novels
Turkish drama films
World War II spy films
Turkish adventure films
1970s Turkish-language films